The Office of the Tasmanian Economic Regulator, or OTTER is the Tasmanian Government agency responsible for various economic and energy supply regulating actions in the Australian state of Tasmania. OTTER is a member of the national Utility Regulators Forum, and it has its headquarters in Hobart, Tasmania.

Duties
Under the Economic Regulator 2009 Act, the Tasmanian Economic Regulator replaced the former Government Prices Oversight Commission as the organization responsible for conducting investigations into the pricing of government agencies and local government bodies that are monopoly suppliers of goods and or services inside Tasmania. OTTER is also responsible for administering the Tasmanian Electricity Code and the Electricity Supply Industry Act 1995, and licensing energy suppliers in Tasmania.  In 2000, through the Gas Act 2000 OTTER was given the responsibility to license gas suppliers and "facilitating the development of a gas supply industry in Tasmania".

Board
The board of the Tasmanian Economic Regulator is:

Previous bodies
In 2009, through the Economic Regulator Act 2009, The Tasmanian Economic Regulator replaced the Electricity Regulator, the Director of Gas, Government Prices Oversight Commission and the Water and Sewerage Economic Regulator, who had previously divided OTTER's duties between them.

See also

 List of Tasmanian government agencies

References

External links
Homepage of the Tasmanian Energy Regulator
Homepage of the Energy Ombudsman

Government agencies of Tasmania
Energy in Tasmania
Regulatory authorities of Australia
2008 establishments in Australia